Eudes, Odo or Otto of Burgundy may refer to:
Otto, Duke of Burgundy (944–965)
Odo I, Duke of Burgundy (1060–1102)
Odo II, Duke of Burgundy (1118–1162) 
Odo III, Duke of Burgundy (1166–1218)
Odo IV, Duke of Burgundy (1295–1349)
Odo, Count of Nevers  (1230–1266)
Otto-William, Count of Burgundy (d. 1026)

See also
Henry I, Duke of Burgundy, born Otto